Thompson Township may refer to:

Canada

 Thompson Township, Algoma District, Ontario

United States

Arkansas

 Thompson Township, Pike County, Arkansas, in Pike County, Arkansas

Illinois

 Thompson Township, Jo Daviess County, Illinois

Iowa

 Thompson Township, Guthrie County, Iowa

Michigan

 Thompson Township, Schoolcraft County, Michigan

Minnesota

 Thompson Township, Kittson County, Minnesota

North Carolina

 Thompson Township, Robeson County, North Carolina, in Robeson County, North Carolina

Ohio

 Thompson Township, Delaware County, Ohio
 Thompson Township, Geauga County, Ohio
 Thompson Township, Seneca County, Ohio

Pennsylvania

 Thompson Township, Fulton County, Pennsylvania
 Thompson Township, Susquehanna County, Pennsylvania

See also

Thompson (disambiguation)
Thomson Township (disambiguation)

Township name disambiguation pages